The 1962 Six Hour Le Mans was an endurance motor race for Sports Cars, Sedans and GT cars. The event was held at the Caversham circuit in Western Australia, Australia on 3 June 1962. There were a total of 31 starters in the race, which was the eighth Six Hour Le Mans.

The race was won by Derek Jolly and John Roxburgh driving a Lotus 15 Coventry Climax.

Results

References

Further reading
Terry Walker, Around The Houses - The History of Motor Racing in Western Australia, 1980

External links
Terry Walker's Place - Western Australian Motor Racing History, as archived at web.archive.org

Six Hours Le Mans
Six Hour Le Mans